The 1984–85 Cupa României was the 47th edition of Romania's most prestigious football cup competition.

The title was won by Steaua București against Universitatea Craiova.

Format
The competition is an annual knockout tournament.

First round proper matches are played on the ground of the lowest ranked team, then from the second round proper the matches are played on a neutral location.

If a match is drawn after 90 minutes, the game goes in extra time, if the scored is still tight after 120 minutes, then the winner will be established at penalty kicks.

From the first edition, the teams from Divizia A entered in competition in sixteen finals, rule which remained till today.

First round proper

|colspan=3 style="background-color:#FFCCCC;"|29 November 1984

|-
|colspan=3 style="background-color:#FFCCCC;"|15 December 1984

|-
|colspan=3 style="background-color:#FFCCCC;"|16 February 1985

Notes:
 CS Târgovişte lost the match because players didn't have the identification cards.

Second round proper

|colspan=3 style="background-color:#FFCCCC;"|20 February 1985

Quarter-finals

|colspan=3 style="background-color:#FFCCCC;"|27 February 1985

Semi-finals

|colspan=3 style="background-color:#FFCCCC;"|12 June 1985

Final

References

External links
 romaniansoccer.ro
 Official site
 The Romanian Cup on the FRF's official site

Cupa României seasons
Cupa Romaniei
Romania